Matthew 14:5 is the fifth verse in the fourteenth chapter of the Gospel of Matthew in the New Testament.

Content
In the original Greek according to Westcott-Hort for this verse is:
Καὶ θέλων αὐτὸν ἀποκτεῖναι, ἐφοβήθη τὸν ὄχλον, ὅτι ὡς προφήτην αὐτὸν εἶχον.  

In the King James Version of the Bible the text reads:
And when he would have put him to death, he feared the multitude, because they counted him as a prophet.

The New International Version translates the passage as:
Herod wanted to kill John, but he was afraid of the people, because they considered him a prophet.

Analysis
Seeing the people held John as a prophet Herod held back his passion, even though his wife undoubtedly would have moved him otherwise. Still from Mark 6:20 we find that Herod very much respected John's virtue and holiness.

Commentary from the Church Fathers
Jerome: "He feared a disturbance among the people for John’s sake, for he knew that multitudes had been baptized by him in Jordan; but he was overcome by love of his wife, which had already made him neglect the commands of. God."

Glossa Ordinaria: " The fear of God amends us, the fear of man torments us, but alters not our will; it rather renders us more impatient to sin as it has held us back for a time from our indulgence."

References

External links
Other translations of Matthew 14:5 at BibleHub

14:5